The 428th Bombardment Squadron is an inactive United States Air Force unit. Its last assignment was with the 310th Bombardment Wing at Schilling Air Force Base, Kansas, where it was inactivated on 1 January 1962.  The squadron had been activated in 1959 in response to Strategic Air Command's expanded nuclear alert, but was inactivated when alert commitments changed.

The squadron was first active during World War II as a medium bomber unit.  After training in the United States, it deployed to the Mediterranean Theater of Operations, where it participated in Operation Torch, the invasion of North Africa.  It moved forward with American ground forces.  The squadron was awarded a two Distinguished Unit Citations for its actions in combat.  Following V-E Day, the squadron was inactivated in theater.

History

World War II

Activated as a North American B-25 Mitchell reconnaissance squadron in early 1942, it was redesignated a medium bomber unit in April. It trained with the Third Air Force in the southeastern United States. It was  deployed initially to England in September 1942 and flew some missions under VIII Bomber Command over German-occupied France; attacking enemy troop formations, bridges and airfields. It was part of the Operation Torch invasion of North Africa in November 1942, being deployed to the new Mediterranean Theater of Operations. It was assigned to the Twelfth Air Force in French Morocco in November. The squadron engaged primarily in support and interdictory operations; bombing marshalling yards, rail lines, highways, bridges, viaducts, troop concentrations, gun emplacements, shipping, harbors and other objectives in North Africa.

The squadron also engaged in psychological warfare missions, dropping propaganda leaflets behind enemy lines. It took part in the Allied operations against Axis forces in North Africa  during March–May 1943, the reduction of Pantelleria and Lampedusa islands during June, the invasion of Sicily in July and the landing at Salerno in September. The squadron was also involved in the Allied advance toward Rome during January–June 1944, the invasion of Southern France in August 1944 and the Allied operations in northern Italy from September 1944 to April 1945.   It was inactivated in Italy after the German capitulation in September 1945.

Strategic Air Command
From 1958, the Boeing B-47 Stratojet wings of Strategic Air Command (SAC) began to assume an alert posture at their home bases, reducing the amount of time spent on alert at overseas bases.  The SAC alert cycle divided itself into four parts: planning, flying, alert and rest to meet General Thomas S. Power’s initial goal of maintaining one third of SAC’s planes on fifteen minute ground alert, fully fueled and ready for combat to reduce vulnerability to a Soviet missile strike.  To implement this new system B-47 wings reorganized from three to four squadrons.  The 428th was activated at Schilling Air Force Base as the fourth squadron of the 310th Bombardment Wing.  The alert commitment was increased to half the squadron's aircraft in 1962 and the four squadron pattern no longer met the alert cycle commitment, so the squadron was inactivated on 1 January 1962.

Lineage
 Constituted as the 39th Reconnaissance Squadron (Medium) on 28 January 1942
 Activated on 15 March 1942
 Redesignated 428th Bombardment Squadron (Medium) on 22 April 1942
 Redesignated 428th Bombardment Squadron, Medium c. 20 August 1943
 Inactivated on 12 September 1945
 Activated on 1 February 1959
 Discontinued and inactivated on 1 January 1962

Assignments
 310th Bombardment Group, 15 March 1942 – 12 September 1945
 310th Bombardment Wing, 1 February 1959 – 1 January 1962

Stations

 Davis-Monthan Field, Arizona, 15 March 1942
 Jackson Army Air Base, Mississippi, 15 March 1942
 Key Field, Mississippi, 25 April 1942
 Columbia Army Air Base, South Carolina, c.18 May 1942
 Walterboro Army Air Field, South Carolina, 14 August 1942
 Greenville Army Air Base, South Carolina, 18 September  – 17 October 1942 (ground echelon)
 RAF Hardwick, England, September–November 1942 (air echelon)
 Mediouna Airfield, French Morocco, 19 November 1942
 Telergma Airfield, Algeria, 21 December 1942
 Berteaux Airfield, Algeria, 1 January 1943
 Dar el Koudia Airfield, Tunisia, 6 June 1943
 Menzel Temime Airfield, Tunisia, 5 August 1943 (operated from Oudna Airfield 11 October – 14 November 1943)
 Philippeville Airfield, Algeria, c. 19  November 1943
 Ghisonaccia Airfield, Corsica, France, 4 January 1944
 Fano Airfield, Italy, 7 April 1945
 Pomigliano Airfield, Italy, c. 15 August – 12 September 1945
 Schilling Air Force Base, Kansas, 1 February 1959 – 1 January 1962

Aircraft
 North American B-25 Mitchell, 1942-1945
 Boeing B-47 Stratojet, 1959-1962

References

Notes
 Explanatory notes

 Citations

Bibliography

 
 
 
 
 

Bombardment squadrons of the United States Air Force
Bombardment squadrons of the United States Army Air Forces
Military units and formations established in 1942
Units and formations of Strategic Air Command